Baldini Castoldi Dalai Editore is an Italian publishing house, founded in 1897 and located under the arcades of Galleria Vittorio Emanuele in Milan. Baldini & Castoldi changed its name to Dalai Editore in 2011, and "Baldini & Castoldi" became a series of Dalai Editore. The company has published several successful authors.

History
Founder members were Ettore Baldini, Antenore Castoldi, Alceste Borella and the poet Gian Pietro Lucini, who had acquired the small publishing house Galli and Omodei and then renamed it as Baldini & Castoldi.  At his foundation, it had a registered capital of 60,000 lire. Among the first successful authors there were Antonio Fogazzaro, Gerolamo Rovetta, Neera (Anna Zuccari), Salvator Gotta and Guido da Verona; particularly da Verona was the most commercially successful Italian writer between 1914 and 1939.

Timeline

In 1940 the management was renewed with the arrival of Enrico Castoldi that opened more to the presence in the catalog of foreign authors (especially Hungarian), but begin a descent of sales that took it to suspend its activities in 1970.

In 1991 the publishing house was taken by Alessandro Dalai (that bought the shares owned by the publishing group Elemond) and Oreste del Buono. The house was so raised offering numerous book series focused on fiction, nonfiction, history, economy, humor and satire (with the series Le formiche).  An important part of their publications was reserved to debuts and emerging writers. A key role in the revitalization of the brand was given by the success of the humorous books by Gino and Michele and then by Va dove ti porta il cuore, a novel written by Susanna Tamaro which became in a short time an international bestseller.  According to a 1997 report, made on the occasion of the centenary of "Baldini e Castoldi", after the Dalai's relaunch the house had 25 employees, an income between 35 and 40 billion lire a year and published about 150 books a year.

In July 2000, Dalai completed the acquisition of the house pointing out the shares owned by the Mondadori Group (since 1994), adding his name to the brand of the publisher.

In 2011 the company changed its name to Dalai Editore and "Baldini & Castoldi" became a series of Dalai Editore. Dalai Editore closed down in 2013. The name "Baldini&Castoldi" still lives on thanks to the effort of a new publishing house, simply named "Baldini&Castoldi".
 
Today, Baldini&Castoldi is one of the most important Italian independent publishers.

Published authors
Some of the publisher's most successful authors are Enrico Brizzi, Giorgio Faletti, Fabio Geda, Gianluca Arrighi, Antonio Pennacchi, Aldo Busi and, since 1993, Paolo Mereghetti with his Dictionary of the film.

See also

 List of Italian companies

References

Further reading

External links
Official website

Italian companies established in 1897
Publishing companies established in 1897
Book publishing companies of Italy
Mass media in Milan
Italian brands